Jason Sechrest (born November 26, 1979, Columbus, Indiana) is an author and journalist. He began his writing career at 15 years old as a staff writer for Femme Fatales, an entertainment publication. He interviewed actresses from horror B movies, science-fiction and fantasy films.  In 2016, he was hired by Cemetery Dance Publications to write a regular column called “What I Learned From Stephen King”  In it, he explores the wisdom, life lessons, and spirituality hidden within Stephen King’s many works.

In 2017, Sechrest became a published author of horror fiction. His short horror story "Jonah Inside the Whale: A Meditation" was published by Scarlet Galleon Publications in the paperback horror anthology, Fearful Fathoms: Collected Tales of Aquatic Terror (Volume One).

Sechrest currently owns and operates the website SechrestThings.com, dedicated to his insights on the horror genre.

References

External links

1979 births
Living people
Bisexual men
American columnists
Writers from Los Angeles
American bisexual writers